The Bordeaux Prison, also known as the Montreal Detention Centre, is a provincial prison in Montreal, Quebec, Canada. It is located at 800 Gouin Boulevard West in the borough of Ahuntsic-Cartierville.

The prison was built in 1908 to 1912 by architect  to replace the aged Pied-du-Courant Prison. The prison currently houses male inmates sentenced to less than two years' imprisonment. It also houses prisoners awaiting trial.

It is the largest provincial prison in Quebec, with a maximum capacity of 1,189 inmates.

The prison was also an execution site, where 85 hangings were carried out by Quebec between 1912 and 1960.

On Christmas Day, 2022, a 21-year old inmate died after being pepper sprayed by staff while wearing a spit hood in a shower and then left face down in a cell, despite a court having ordered his release on December 23. Investigations by La Presse and The Globe and Mail found that prison staff violated internal policies on the use of pepper spray. A unit manager and a guard were suspended. In addition to the standard coroner investigation, the incident is also subject to an investigation by the Sûreté du Québec and the provincial Ministry of Public Security.

Notable inmates
Albert Guay – mass murderer who conspired to blow up Canadian Pacific Air Lines Flight 108; executed in 1951

Généreux Ruest – mass murderer who conspired to blow up Canadian Pacific Air Lines Flight 108; executed in 1952

Marguerite Pitre – mass murderer who conspired to blow up Canadian Pacific Air Lines Flight 108; and last woman to be hanged in Canada; executed in 1953

Wilbert Coffin – Coffin affair; executed in 1956

References

1912 establishments in Quebec
Ahuntsic-Cartierville
Government buildings in Montreal
Government buildings completed in 1912
Infrastructure completed in 1912
Prisons in Quebec